Taste of Me is the debut extended play by Australian alternative rock duo Teenage Joans, released independently on 28 May 2021. The EP was solely written and recorded by members Tahlia Borg and Cahli Blakers, with production handled by Jarred Nettle.

Preceded by three singles—"Something About Being Sixteen", "Ice Cream", and "Wine"—Taste of Me received critical acclaim, and was the recipient of Best Release at the 2021 South Australian Music Awards.

Background
Taste of Me is the duo's first new music since the single "Three Leaf Clover" in 2020, which was the winning track in the 2020 Triple J Unearthed High competition, and ranked at number 87 in Triple J's Hottest 100 of 2020. The EP also follows an extensive round of touring for the duo.

Composition
"Ice Cream" is a "delectable hit of fun alt-rock", which showcases "the girls' dynamism at its strength", whilst "Something About Being Sixteen" is a "a coming-of-age anthem" with "big riffs and even bigger personality".

Release
On 26 March, Taste of Me was announced, alongside the release of second single "Ice Cream". On 30 March, the duo revealed the EP's tracklist and artwork on Twitter. On 28 May 2021, Taste of Me was independently released, on digital download and streaming formats. On 27 July, Taste of Me received a vinyl release.

Singles 
"Something About Being Sixteen" was released on 15 January 2021 as the lead single. "Ice Cream" was released on 26 March 2021 as the second single. "Wine" was released on 27 May 2021 as the third and final single.

Live performances and tour
On 27 March 2019, the duo appeared on 101.5 FM Radio Adelaide's Breakfast program with Zoe Kounadis and Tom Mann, debuting an unreleased song titled "Therapist" and discussing their forthcoming releases. On 26 March, alongside the EP's announcement, the duo announced a headline tour with the Chats. The tour includes dates in Byron Bay, Wollongong, and Canberra.

Critical reception

Dylan Marshall of The AU Review labelled Taste of Me "five tracks of undeniably fun and charismatic guitar hooks". He continued: "A sign of a good song is being able to enjoy it irrespective of your age or personal music preferences, and on Taste of Me, these songs are in abundance."

The Musics Keira Leonard gave the EP a positive review, writing that it "contains all the perfect methods and madness of an Aussie indie release, while remaining unlike any band before them." She continued, saying: "their five-track debut certainly won't get tiring. It's angsty, wholesome, unified and so damn fun." Joe Dolan, another writer for The Music, was also positive, calling the EP "incredible", stating it "offers a splendid sampler to the music of the group." Dolan added that "it's an all out, upbeat rock release that is devoid of any implied immaturity by their age", and concluded by comparing the release favourably to that of Camp Cope and Courtney Barnett.

NME Australia journalist Alex Gallagher described the EP as "a thrilling formal introduction to their cathartic, bittersweet pop-punk", stating that "[it] makes clear why Teenage Joans have resonated so strongly with their passionate community – and why they'll stick around."

Mid-year lists 
Taste of Me was listed on The Music's 'Top 25 Albums of 2022 (So Far)' list.

End-of-year lists 
"Wine", the closing track of the EP, reached number 84 on the Triple J Hottest 100 of 2021.

Track listing 
All tracks written by Tahlia Borg and Cahli Bakers, and produced by Jarred Nettle.

 "Ice Cream" – 3:30
 "Apple Pie" – 3:17
 "Something About Being Sixteen" – 3:33
 "Therapist" – 3:22
 "Wine" – 4:09

Awards and nominations

South Australian Music Awards

! 
|-
! scope="row" rowspan="2"| 2021
| Taste of Me
| Best Release
| 
| rowspan="2"| 
|-
| Samuel Graves and Eve Burner for Taste of Me
| Best Cover Art
| 
|}

Personnel
Adapted from the EP's liner notes.

Musicians
 Tahlia Borg – vocals, writing, drums
 Cahli Blakers – vocals, writing, guitar

Technical
 Jarred Nettle – producer
Promotional
 Eve Burner – artwork
 Samuel Graves – photography

Release history

Notes

References

External links
 

2021 debut EPs
Teenage Joans EPs
Self-released EPs